Tekoa is a small farming town in Whitman County, Washington, United States. The population was 778 at the 2010 census.

Based on per capita income, one of the more reliable measures of affluence, Tekoa ranks 420th of 522 areas in the state of Washington to be ranked.

The town is centered in the rolling fields of the Palouse and features the landmark Milwaukee Road Bridge, a railroad trestle, as well as the John Wayne Trail. Tekoa is also known for its historic Empire Theatre, built in 1940 in an art-deco style, that the town's citizens have lovingly restored. The town beholds few shops and even fewer restaurants to stop at while traveling the Palouse Scenic Byway (Highway 27).

Every June, the town of Tekoa holds their annual celebration, the Slippery Gulch Festival, featuring a parade, egg toss, and fireworks.

History

The area that includes the present-day Town of Tekoa was settled by the Coeur d'Alene people. In 1886, David A. Huffman and George T. Huffman settled there. The townsite was platted in 1888 and was named after the Biblical town.

Tekoa was incorporated in 1889 with just under 300 people at the base of Tekoa Mountain (elevation 2,490 feet), on the extreme eastern end of the Palouse, and to the west of the Benewah Range of Idaho. By 1910 the population had grown to 1,694. Over the next 60 years, Tekoa began a population decline. Mechanized farming reduced the need for workers, and the automobile age came into being, as well as the abandonment of the railway. By 1990 the town had fewer than 750 residents. During the 1990s the town increased in popularity and the population rose to 826 at the 2000 census.

Geography
Tekoa is located at  (47.224704, -117.073607).

The zip code is 99033.

Tekoa is located at the confluence where Little Hangman Creek enters Latah Creek.

Climate
This region experiences warm (but not hot) and dry summers, with no average monthly temperatures above 71.6 °F.  According to the Köppen Climate Classification system, Tekoa has a warm-summer Mediterranean climate, abbreviated "Csb" on climate maps.

Demographics

2010 census
At the 2010 census, the city population comprised 778 persons, 307 households, and 191 families. The racial makeup of the city was 92.0% White, 0.1% African American, 3.3% Native American, 0.5% Asian, 0.1% Pacific Islander, 2.3% from other races, and 1.5% from two or more races. Hispanic or Latino of any race were 5.8% of the population.

Of the 307 households 30.9% had children under the age of 18 living with them, 49.5% were married couples living together, 10.1% had a female householder with no husband present, 2.6% had a male householder with no wife present, and 37.8% were non-families. 32.9% of households were one person and 16.3% were one person aged 65 or older. The average household size was 2.36 and the average family size was 3.03.

The median age was 44.4 years. 25.2% of residents were under the age of 18; 5.3% were between the ages of 18 and 24; 20.7% were from 25 to 44; 25.9% were from 45 to 64; and 23% were 65 or older. The gender makeup of the city was 47.0% male and 53.0% female.

2000 census
At the 2000 census, there were 826 people in 318 households, including 220 families, in the city. The population density was 727.2 people per square mile (279.8/km). There were 363 housing units at an average density of 319.6 per square mile (122.9/km). The racial makeup of the city was 93.46% White, 0.36% African American, 2.18% Native American, 0.85% Asian, 0.12% Pacific Islander, 0.12% from other races, and 2.91% from two or more races. Hispanic or Latino of any race were 1.57% of the population.

Of the 318 households 30.5% had children under the age of 18 living with them, 56.3% were married couples living together, 10.7% had a female householder with no husband present, and 30.8% were non-families. 29.2% of households were one person and 15.1% were one person aged 65 or older. The average household size was 2.43 and the average family size was 2.98.

In the city the age distribution of the population shows 27.7% under the age of 18, 4.4% from 18 to 24, 20.5% from 25 to 44, 24.7% from 45 to 64, and 22.8% 65 or older. The median age was 42 years. For every 100 females there were 84.8 males. For every 100 females age 18 and over, there were 86.6 males.

The median household income was $30,833 and the median family income  was $36,771. Males had a median income of $32,014 versus $19,307 for females. The per capita income for the city was $14,344. About 13.2% of families and 14.5% of the population were below the poverty line, including 20.5% of those under age 18 and 10.1% of those age 65 or over.

Notable people
 Mildred Bailey, popular 1930s jazz singer, was born in Tekoa.
 Al Rinker, singer, brother of Bailey and former partner of Bing Crosby in the Rhythm Boys, was also born in Tekoa.

References

External links
Official website

1889 establishments in Washington (state)
Cities in Whitman County, Washington
Cities in Washington (state)